Eugen-Ludwig Zweigart (3 May 1914 – 8 June 1944) a former German fighter ace in the Luftwaffe. He was a recipient of the Knight's Cross of the Iron Cross during World War II, awarded by Nazi Germany for extreme battlefield bravery. He was credited with 69 victories.

On 8 June 1944, Zweigart was shot down flying Focke Wulf Fw-190 A-8 (Werknummer 170736) in aerial combat near Le Cambaux, France. He bailed out and was allegedly shot and killed while hanging in his parachute.

Summary of career

Aerial victory claims
According to US historian David T. Zabecki, Zweigart was credited with 69 aerial victories. Spick also lists him with 69 aerial victories claimed in an unknown number of combat missions. This figure includes 54 aerial victories on the Eastern Front and 15 over the Western Allies. Mathews and Foreman, authors of Luftwaffe Aces — Biographies and Victory Claims, researched the German Federal Archives and found records for 66 aerial victory claims plus two further unconfirmed claims. This figure includes 52 aerial victories on the Eastern Front and 14 on the Western Front, including ten four-engined bombers.

Awards
 Honor Goblet of the Luftwaffe on 26 October 1942 as Oberfeldwebel and pilot
 German Cross in Gold on 17 November 1942 as Oberfeldwebel in the 9./Jagdgeschwader 54
 Knight's Cross of the Iron Cross on 22 January 1943 as Oberfeldwebel and pilot in the 5./Jagdgeschwader 54

References

Citations

Bibliography

 
 
 
 
 
 
 
 
 
 
 

1914 births
1943 deaths
People from Sarreguemines
People from Alsace-Lorraine
Lorraine-German people
Luftwaffe pilots
German World War II flying aces
Luftwaffe personnel killed in World War II
Recipients of the Gold German Cross
Recipients of the Knight's Cross of the Iron Cross
Burials at Saint-Désir-de-Lisieux German war cemetery
Aviators killed by being shot down